Satyajit Bhatkal is an Indian television and film director, best known as director of Satyamev Jayate, a TV show focused on addressing social issues in India.

He is CEO of Paani Foundation, a non-profit founded by Aamir Khan and Kiran Rao, aimed at making Maharashtra drought-free.

Filmography

References 

Living people
Indian television directors
Year of birth missing (living people)